Pat Ashworth SRN, SCM,  (born 1930) is a British nursing sister, specialising in intensive care.

Ashworth qualified at Kent County Ophthalmic and Aural Hospital, Guy's Hospital, Jessop Hospital and Nether Edge Hospital.

She worked in a number of nursing roles until 1973, then a Department of Health and Social Security fellowship until 1976, followed by a joint clinical/academic post at Manchester Royal Infirmary and the University of Manchester until 1979.

She was Manchester's research programme manager at their WHO collaborating centre for nursing from 1979 to 1985; then a senior lecturer in nursing at the University of Ulster from 1985 to 1990.

She served as founding editor of the journal Intensive Care Nursing (later ) from 1985 to 2000.

References

External links 

 

1930 births
Place of birth missing (living people)
Living people
English nurses
Academics of the University of Manchester
Academics of Ulster University
Fellows of the Royal College of Nursing
Fellows of the Faculty of Nursing and Midwifery of the Royal College of Surgeons in Ireland
British midwives

British nurses